Blaniulidae  is a family of millipedes in the order Julida. Members are long and thin, with a length:width ratio of up to 30:1. Eyes may be present or absent, and members have distinctive spots on each segment: the ozadenes or odiferous glands. The family contains the following genera:

Acipes
Alpiobates
Archiboreoiulus
Bilselibates
Blaniulus
Boreoiulus
Choneiulus
Gomphiocephalus
Iberoiulus
Microchoneiulus
Nopoiulus
Occitaniulus
Orphanoiulus
Proteroiulus
Sardoblaniulus
Tarracoblaniulus
Thassoblaniulus
Typhloblaniulus
Vascoblaniulus
Virgoiulus

References

Julida
Millipede families